Arna Toktagan (born 5 February 1986) is a Kazakhstani synchronized swimmer. She competed in the women's duet at the 2004 and 2008 Summer Olympics.

References 

1986 births
Living people
Sportspeople from Almaty
Kazakhstani synchronized swimmers
Olympic synchronized swimmers of Kazakhstan
Synchronized swimmers at the 2004 Summer Olympics
Synchronized swimmers at the 2008 Summer Olympics
Asian Games medalists in artistic swimming
Artistic swimmers at the 2002 Asian Games
Artistic swimmers at the 2006 Asian Games
Medalists at the 2006 Asian Games
Asian Games bronze medalists for Kazakhstan